Competitive Edge Motorsports is a former NASCAR Nextel Cup Series team. It fielded the No. 51 Marathon Oil Chevrolet. Its principal owner was former NFL player Joe Auer.

CEM debuted at the 2004 Coca-Cola 600 with Kevin Lepage driving, finishing 43rd after suffering overheating failures. After running four more races with Lepage, all resulting in DNF's, Tony Raines took over the driving duties, his best finish being 28th at Dover. In 2005, ARCA racer Stuart Kirby began driving, qualifying for seven races, posting a best finish of 31st. Mike Garvey drove for the team in 2006, but after Joe Auer became concerned with the lack of performance and under funding, the team decided to allow Petty Enterprises finish off their sponsorship obligation.

Car No. 51 results

External links 
 Official website for CEM
 Owner Stats at Racing-Reference.info

Auto racing teams established in 2004
Auto racing teams disestablished in 2006
Defunct NASCAR teams
American auto racing teams